Dichomeris marmoratus is a moth in the family Gelechiidae. It was described by Walsingham in 1891. It is found in the Central African Republic, Namibia and Gambia.

The wingspan is about 12 mm. The forewings are dull ochreous, mottled and shaded with fuscous and with an ill-defined fuscous spot on the disc about the middle. The hindwings are grey.

References

Moths described in 1881
marmoratus